Mariusz Kazana (5 August 1960 – 10 April 2010) was a Polish diplomat and political figure.

Kazana was born in Bydgoszcz.  He served as Director of Diplomatic Protocol in the Ministry of Foreign Affairs until his death in the 2010 Polish Air Force Tu-154 crash near Smolensk.

Honours and awards
Grand Officer of the Order of Merit of the Portuguese Republic - 2008
National Order of Merit of the Republic of Malta, Class IV - 2009
Commander's Cross of the Order Pro Merito Melitensi - 2009
Knight's Cross of the Order of Merit of the Republic of Hungary - 2009
Officer's Cross of the Order of Polonia Restituta - 2010, posthumously
Badge of Honour "Bene Merito" - 2010, posthumously
Titular diplomatic ambassador - 2010, posthumously
Medal of Merit for the Police - 2010, posthumously

References
 Biographical sketch

1960 births
2010 deaths
Polish diplomats
Officers of the Order of Polonia Restituta
Grand Officers of the Order of Merit (Portugal)
Knight's Crosses of the Order of Merit of the Republic of Hungary (civil)
Recipients of the National Order of Merit (Malta)
Recipients of the Order pro Merito Melitensi
Victims of the Smolensk air disaster
People from Bydgoszcz
University of Warsaw alumni